Events from the year 1680 in Denmark.

Incumbents 

 Monarch – Christian V
 Grand Chancellor – Frederik Ahlefeldt

Events

Births 
 26 October – Prince Charles of Denmark, prince of Denmark (died 1729)
 20 November
 Alexander Frederik Møsting, royal court official (died 1737)
 Severin de Junge, Supreme Court justice and director of the Danish West India Company (died 1757)

Undated 
 Rasmus Krag, naval officer (died 1755)

Deaths 
 25 April – Simon Paulli, physician and naturalist (born 1603)
 4 December – Thomas Bartholin,  physician, mathematician, and theologian (born 1616)
 29 December – Arent Berntsen, topographical-statistical author, businessman, banker, estate owner and councillor (born 1610)

References

See also 

 
Denmark
Years of the 17th century in Denmark